Whitwell House is a place in County Durham, in England situated a few miles to the south-east of Durham.  It now consists of the hamlet of Whitwell Grange, but was from 1836 was the site of the village of Whitwell Colliery.  The village declined following the closure of the colliery in 1875 and was described as 'almost deserted' by 1894.

Whitwell House was also an extra-parochial chapelry, and from 1858 a civil parish until its incorporation with Shincliffe.  The chapelry was closely associated with the nearby Sherburn Hospital.

External links
 Durham Mining Museum entry on Whitwell Colliery
 Vision of Britain entry on Whitwell House
 GenUKi entry on Whitwell House
 Northern Echo Durham Memories article on Whitwell and its associations with New Durham

Whitwell Grange